Pablo Díaz-Reixa (born November 17, 1983), professionally known as el  Guincho, is a Spanish musician, singer, and record producer.

Díaz-Reixa rose to prominence with his 2008 album, Alegranza. His musical style relies heavily on the use of sampling and incorporates elements of Afrobeat, dub, tropicália and rock and roll. Díaz-Reixa has described his style of production as "space-age exotica". He primarily produces music with a Roland SP-404.

Early life
Díaz-Reixa was born as an only child in Las Palmas de Gran Canaria, in the Canary Islands. After finishing high school, he moved to Barcelona, Spain, for college, where he majored in media studies. While in the city, he started to make music and was a member of the band Coconot.

Career

Beginnings and first two albums: 2007–2014
He released his first album, Folías, independently in 2007. In October 2008, he released his breakthrough album, Alegranza, which was well received by critics, including earning a "Best New Music" designation by Pitchfork. He would spend the next two years touring the album worldwide.

In September 2010, Díaz-Reixa released Pop Negro, under British independent label Young Turks. The album includes the now popular single "Bombay." Notably, he worked on Björk's 2011 album Biophilia. Previously, in 2008, he remixed her on Enjoyed: A Tribute to Björk's Post.

Hiperasia and producing for Rosalía: 2014–present
While temporarily living in his hometown of Las Palmas de Gran Canaria, Díaz-Reixa worked on a collection of music that would later be his next album, Hiperasia. With a departure from his tropical sound, the album takes influences from trap and electronic music, employing heavy use of Vocoder and Autotune. It was released in February 2016.

That same year, Díaz-Reixa saw Spanish singer Rosalia live, and, fascinated by her sound, contacted her through social media to collaborate. He would later be sole producer of her sophomore album El Mal Querer, released in 2018. The album received critical acclaim. At the 19th Latin Grammy Awards, the single "Malamente" was nominated for five awards, including Record of the Year, Song of the Year, Best Urban Fusion Performance, and Best Alternative Song, winning the latter two. The next year's ceremony, the album won for Album of the Year, Best Contemporary Pop Vocal Album and Best Recording Package, while the song "Pienso en tu mirá" received a nomination for Best Pop Song. Díaz-Reixa received won for Best Engineered Album. The album also won the Grammy Award for Best Latin Rock, Urban or Alternative Album at the 62nd Annual Grammy Awards.

In 2019, Díaz-Reixa co-produced and featured in the successful single "Con Altura," with Rosalia and J Balvin. In 2020, his work with artists like Rosalia, Aitana, and Paloma Mami earned him a Latin Grammy nomination for Producer of the Year.

Personal life
Díaz-Reixa has lived in Barcelona since 2002. He is of partly Cuban descent through his grandmother, which he says was an inspiration on the Tropicalia influences on his earlier works.

Discography

Studio albums

Extended plays

As producer

Awards and nominations

Grammy Awards

Latin Grammy Awards

Other awards and nominations

References

External links
 Young Turks, El Guincho: Pop Negro

Spanish musicians
Living people
Latin Grammy Award winners
1983 births
Latin music record producers
Latin music songwriters